The Quest is an American Western series which aired on NBC from September to December 1976. The series stars Kurt Russell and Tim Matheson.

The pilot episode aired as a television movie on May 13, 1976.

Overview

Two brothers Morgan (Kurt Russell) and Quentin Bodine (Matheson) are seeking the whereabouts of their long-lost sister, Patricia, thought to be held by the Cheyenne. The siblings were separated after their parents were killed during an "Indian massacre". Morgan, known as "Two Persons", was a captive of the Cheyenne for eight years until he was freed by the United States Army. Quentin was taken to San Francisco, where he was educated as a physician.

After their reunion, the pair journey together over thousands of miles across the Great Plains and the Rocky Mountains in search of Patricia; hence, the title The Quest.

Cast
 Kurt Russell as Morgan 'Two Persons' Beaudine
 Tim Matheson as Quinton Beaudine
 Brian Keith as Tank Logan
 Keenan Wynn as H.H. Small

Guest actors
 John Anderson
 Rayford Barnes
 Bibi Besch
 Neville Brand
 Susan Dey
 Erik Estrada
 I. Stanford Jolley
 Gary Lockwood
 Pamela Sue Martin
 Don Meredith
 Hal Miller
 Cameron Mitchell
 Read Morgan
 Judson Pratt
 Pernell Roberts
 Morgan Woodward
 Cheryl Smith Unaired Episode 14

Episodes
A pilot movie aired on May 13, 1976 as a preview of the upcoming series; it received strong ratings, placing in the top 20 programs for the week. The first regular series episode was broadcast on September 22 with an extended 90 minute runtime to recap events from the pilot.

The Quest aired at the 9/10 p.m. Wednesday timeslot, deliberately targeting an adult audience after the failure of the family-oriented western Sara earlier in 1976. It ran opposite Charlie's Angels on ABC, also debuting that fall, and The Blue Knight on CBS.

Background and production

Development
The series was created by Tracy Keenan Wynn, son of Keenan Wynn, who also made two appearances on the series. David Gerber served as the executive producer. Gerber intended to duplicate the "gritty realism, ... attention to detail, character and authenticity" of Police Story in the first prime time western since the end of Gunsmoke. It was the only western scheduled for the upcoming fall 1976 television season.

Filming
Much of the filming was in Arizona.

Cancellation
Consistently low ratings, coupled with the fact that Westerns had fallen out of favor with networks and audiences, contributed to the demise of the series. NBC confirmed reports that The Quest had been canceled during its first season on December 7, 1976, and the final episode aired on December 29, 1976. Four of the fifteen episodes produced never aired in the US.

Release

Home media
While the entire series has not been released on DVD, a two-part episode, "The Longest Drive", was released on Region 1 DVD by Sony Pictures Home Entertainment in 2005. The television film which served as the series' pilot episode was also released on DVD by Sony in 2011.

Syndication
, The Quest airs on the classic TV network Get TV on Sunday afternoons, including the four episodes that were not originally aired.

The series is currently available for streaming online on Crackle, while its two-part episode, "The Longest Drive" is currently available for streaming online on Tubi.

Reception
David Eden, reviewing the series for the Albuquerque Journal, compared the chemistry between Russell and Matheson to Starsky and Hutch and praised the acting, script, and production, but concluded the series was not refreshing because it repeated "too many tired story lines from old Westerns".

Awards
Grady Hunt was nominated for the 1977 prime time Emmy Award in costume design for a drama or comedy series for his work on The Quest.

One episode, "Hatcher's Drive" won a Spur Award in 1976 from the Western Writers of America for script writers Katharyn Powers and Michael Michaelian. The writers tied with "The Macahans" by Jim Byrnes for How the West Was Won on ABC.

See also
The Searchers

References

External links 
  (TV Movie – Pilot film)
  (TV Series)
  (DVD Release) 
  (DVD Release)
 

1976 American television series debuts
1976 American television series endings
1970s American drama television series
English-language television shows
NBC original programming
1970s Western (genre) television series
Television series by Sony Pictures Television
Television shows set in Arizona